RSNO may refer to:

Royal Scottish National Orchestra
a generic s-nitrosothiol